Portrait of a Courtesan or Portrait of a Woman is a c. 1520 oil on canvas painting by Palma Vecchio, now in the Museo Poldi Pezzoli in Milan.

History
Probably produced during the artist's Venetian period, it was acquired by count Gian Giacomo Poldi Pezzoli for his new collection in 1865 as a work by Giorgione from the art dealer Terzaghi of Milan, without any earlier provenance. It was restored in the 19th century by Giuseppe Molteni and Luigi Cavenaghi and in 1951 by Mauro Pellicioli.

References

Courtesan
Paintings by Palma Vecchio
1520 paintings
Portraits of women
Paintings in the collection of the Museo Poldi Pezzoli